The Chichesters also known as the Chichester Gang, along with the Forty Thieves, Shirt Tails, and Kerryonians, were one of the oldest early 19th century Irish Five Points street gangs during the mid 19th century in New York City. The Chichester Gang was organized by its founder  John Chichester. The gang got their start by stealing from stores and warehouses and selling the stolen goods to local fences in the 1820s and later became involved in illegal gambling and robbery. An ally of the Dead Rabbits against the Bowery Boys, the Chichesters maintained between 50-100 members lasting for more than 50 years before being absorbed by the Whyos, much like many of the early gangs, following the American Civil War in 1865.

References
Asbury, Herbert.  The Gangs of New York:  An Informal History of the New York Underworld, New York, 1928.
Mohl, Raymond A.  The Making of Urban America.  Rowman & Littlefield, 1997.
Prime, Samuel. Life in New York.  New York, 1847.
Smith, Barbara.  Radical History Review Volume 52.  Cambridge University Press, 1992.
Trumbull, Jonathan and Nancy F. Cott. Prostitution:  Volume 9 of History of women in the United States.  Walter de Gruyter, 1993.
Wilentz, Sean. Chants Democratic: New York City and the Rise of the American Working Class, 1788-1850.  Oxford University Press, 2004.
New-York Commercial Advertiser July 11, 1835.
New York Herald 1835-1836.

Former gangs in New York City
Irish-American gangs